The Suntory Cup is a defunct invitational men's tennis tournament that was held at the Yoyogi National Stadium in Tokyo, Japan from 1978 to 1986. The indoor tournament was played in April each year and consisted of a four-man draw. The event was not recognized as an official tournament by the Association of Tennis Professionals (ATP) or the International Tennis Federation (ITF) but still attracted the world's leading players due to the financial rewards. Jimmy Connors won the event a record four times. The 1983 edition was noteworthy as it was Björn Borg's last tournament before his retirement.

Results

Singles

Draws

1978

1980

1981

1982

1983

1984

1985

1986

See also
 Tokyo Indoor

Notes

References

Carpet court tennis tournaments
Defunct tennis tournaments in Japan
Exhibition tennis tournaments
Recurring sporting events established in 1978
Recurring sporting events disestablished in 1986
1978 establishments in Japan
1986 disestablishments in Japan